The Southern Nazarene Crimson Storm are the athletic teams that represent Southern Nazarene University, located in Bethany, Oklahoma, in intercollegiate sports as a member of the NCAA Division II ranks, primarily competing in the Great American Conference (GAC) since the 2012–13 academic year. The Crimson Storm previously competed in the Sooner Athletic Conference (SAC) of the National Association of Intercollegiate Athletics (NAIA) from 1978–79 to 2011–12; and in the Texoma Athletic Conference from 1972–73 to 1977–78.

Mascot
In 1999, the Crimson Storm athletic nickname replaced the "Redskins", and the "Thundercat" was debuted as the mascot in 2003.

Staff
The current athletic director is Bobby Martin, and the SNU Sports Information Director is Scott Secor,.

Facilities
Crimson Storm facilities include the Sawyer Center for basketball, indoor track, and volleyball, the Cypert Complex for baseball and softball, the Wanda Rhodes Complex for soccer, and the SNU Stadium for football. SNU Sports Information hosts the annual SNUPY Awards every spring.

Varsity teams
SNU compete in 20 intercollegiate varsity sports: Men's sports include baseball, basketball, cheerleading, cross country, equestrian, football, golf, rugby, soccer and track & field; while women's sports include basketball, cheerleading, cross country, equestrian, golf, rugby, soccer, softball, track & field and volleyball.

Baseball
Baseball came back to SNU in 1997 after almost a 20-year hiatus. Made in to the regional tournament in 2007 under coach Scott Selby. SNU recorded their first ever win in a regional that year, upsetting the nationally ranked Oklahoma City University Stars. Also in 2007, a new coach took over the Storm, Elliot Johnson. SNU's baseball team plays all of its home games at the Caulde and Betty Cypert Athletic Complex.

Men's basketball
Basketball has had a long tradition of excellence at SNU. The Crimson Storm, at the time the BNC Redskins, won the National Championship in 1981 NAIA Division I men's basketball tournament, and were the National Runner-Up in the 1998 NAIA Division I men's basketball tournament. They appeared in the NAIA Tournament 11 times.

Women's basketball
Have the most wins in NAIA Women's basketball history taking home the National Tournament title 7 times and are 4 times in a row. Most recent championship was 2013.

Equestrian
Although not recognized by the NAIA as a core sport, SNU has an equestrian team that competes in various horse shows and rodeos throughout the year.

Football

The Crimson Storm Football team was established in 2000. The football team has an 8-year combined record of 50-32. Although the Crimson Storm has not had a losing season over the past 8 years, it has also never made it to the playoffs. In 2004, the Crimson Storm joined the Central States Football League. In 2007, SNU won its first season opener. The football team plays all their home games at SNU Football Stadium. This stadium is also shared with Bethany High School Bronchos football team, although the schools have separate practice facilities and locker rooms. SNU Football Stadium opened in 2001. It seats just under 10,000 and has lawn seating at both end zones. At the games, SNU's "Crimson Stix" perform drum-line cadences.

2008 season

The Crimson Storm won their 2008 home opener on Saturday August 30, at 6 pm vs Eastern New Mexico University. This game had an almost 3 hour delay due to heavy thunderstorms. The 'Storm also defeated Olivet Nazarene University, but lost the next two games to University of Mary Hardin-Baylor and Oklahoma Panhandle State University.

Track
The Crimson Storm Track team competes in both men's and women's meets, as well as outdoor and indoor track and field events.

Volleyball

The Crimson Storm won the Sooner Athletic Conference tournament in 2006. The head coach of the volleyball team is Kevin Ingram.

Men's tennis
SNU Men's Tennis is the only sport to receive a self-administered (from the University not the NAIA) "death penalty" for ethics violations by team members in 1999. As of 2021, it is still not offered.

SNUPY Awards

The SNUPY Awards "were created by the SNU Office of Sports Information in 2004 and designed to honor Southern Nazarene University’s Student-Athletes for excellence on the playing field, in the classroom and in life." Any one of SNU’s athletes are eligible to win a SNUPY based on their nomination in a specific category. They were inspired by and named similarly to the ESPY Awards.

In addition to special recognition of the current year's All-Americans, Academic All-Americans, and a special presentation to the graduating senior class. there are 20 other awards:

 Champions of Character Award
 Courage Award
 Crimson Heart Award
 Female Performance of the Year
 Male Performance of the Year
 Female Newcomer of the Year
 Male Newcomer of the Year
 Spirit Award
 Female Breakthrough Athlete of the Year
 Male Breakthrough Athlete of the Year

 Female Student Athlete of the Year
 Male Student Athlete of the Year
 Female Athlete of the Year
 Male Athlete of the Year
 Female Team of the Year
 Male Team of the Year
 Coach of the Year
 Mr. Storm
 Ms. Storm
 Heritage Moment

Championships
 1981 NAIA Division I men's basketball tournament

Notable athletes
 Brandon Durham, an All-American basketball player who was once named as the NAIA Division I National Player of the Week

References

External links